Spunky is a fictional character in the Nickelodeon cartoon series Rocko's Modern Life and the comic book series of the same name.

Spunky is Rocko's dog. Though not explicitly stated on the show, he is a Miniature Bull Terrier. Spunky emits foul odors, eats trash, drinks his saliva, and rolls in and eats Ed Bighead's salmon bushes, causing Mr. Bighead to feel annoyed. Nickelodeon Southeast Asia's website described him as "loving", "loyal" and "gassy".

Development
Joe Murray, creator of Rocko's Modern Life, originally designed Spunky to be a dog more brain dead than the dog in his film My Dog Zero, complete with drooling and crossed eyes. Murray later decided that the scenario could "limit the storytelling," so he gave Spunky "a little more intelligence, but not much."

Character
Spunky is different compared to most cartoon dogs, who are often more intelligent than their masters. Spunky is far less intelligent than even real dogs. He drools all the time with a vacant expression. One of his humorous actions is drooling into his water dish, mistaking it for more water, and drinking it again, and then repeating this over and over. He also sits limply on his butt, and drags it as he crawls around the house. He is always getting Rocko into crazy situations because of his stupidity. Once, he ended up getting eaten by a big dog (Earl) after carelessly getting thrown out as trash. He also wandered off and was snatched away by a bird at the beach, and once got vacuum packed at the supermarket. Spunky is always safe in the end, thanks to Rocko's utmost care. Rocko appears to have a loving special bond with Spunky. Even though Rocko treats him like a brother, he does what every pet owner does: he plays with Spunky, feeds him, bathes him, and walks him. Rocko never puts him on a leash during a walk. Spunky also sleeps with Rocko in the bed.

Bloaty and Squirmy
Spunky is also a host to two parasites named Bloaty the Tick and Squirmy the Ringworm. These two characters have had a couple episodes that revolve around them and their lives on Spunky. The way they live is much different from that of Rocko and the other characters: they sit in "armscabs", find food that Spunky has eaten, and sometimes drink by sticking straws into Spunky's veins and taking in blood like real parasites.
One of their adventures focused on exploring "new land" which had mysteriously appeared for no explainable reason. Later in the episode, it was revealed that the new land was a result of Spunky gaining weight, thus stretching out his body.

Episodes
Spunky is a major character in Rocko's Modern Life, and therefore has played an important role in many episodes. In "Trash-O-Madness," Spunky caused trouble by playing with a "slime" that Rocko found in the refrigerator, and then he was taken out with the rest of the trash and nearly thrown away forever. In "Sand in Your Navel," Spunky and Rocko head to the beach for a relaxing day, which soon turns into a crazy experience due to Spunky's antics. He was swooped away by a large bird, and then sold as a fish. Rocko had to chase him around the beach and then buy him back. Spunky is also well known for falling in love with a mop in "Clean Lovin'" - an episode that is popular among fans for having many innuendos. Spunky has played a role in many other episodes, such as being held hostage by Ed Bighead in "Sailing the 7 Zzzs," swallowing a bad pill in "Down the Hatch," and even being interviewed in "Dumbbells."

Video game appearance
Spunky also stars in his own game, Rocko's Modern Life: Spunky's Dangerous Day. The title is similar to Rocko's catchphrase in which that a day "is a very dangerous day", (e.g., "Garbage Day is a very dangerous day.").

References

Television characters introduced in 1992
Fictional dogs
Male characters in animated series
Rocko's Modern Life characters
Animated characters introduced in 1992